Grant Louis Reuber,  (November 23, 1927 - July 7, 2018) was a Canadian economist, academic, civil servant, and businessman.

Early life and education
Born in Mildmay, Ontario, the son of Jacob Daniel and Gertrude Catherine (Wahl) Reuber, Reuber attended Walkerton High School. He received an honours Bachelor of Arts degree in Economics from the University of Western Ontario in 1950. He received his Masters in Economics from Harvard University in 1954 and his Ph.D in 1957.

Career
He was a professor of economics at the University of Western Ontario from 1962 to 1969, and was the first economist to explicitly use the inverse relationship between unemployment and inflation as a policy constraint. As a result, policy makers could no longer institute policies that lowered inflation without worrying about raising unemployment (and vice versa). He became the first dean of the Faculty of Social Science at the University of Western Ontario in 1969, was named Vice-President (Academic) and Provost in 1974, and served as Chancellor from 1988 to 1992.  At the time of his death the President of Western described his contributions to the university as "virtually unrivaled" and said that "no one has played so many important leadership roles within the institution".

From 1979 to 1980, he was the deputy minister of Finance under Joe Clark. From 1983 to 1987, he was President and Chief Operating Officer of the Bank of Montreal. From 1993 to 1999 he was chairman of the Canada Deposit Insurance Corporation, a period in which "virtually every aspect" of the organization was transformed.

From 1996 to 1999, he was chair of the Loran Scholars program, and from 1998 to 2008 he chaired the Donner Prize jury.

In 1986, he was made an officer of the Order of Canada and a fellow of the Royal Society of Canada.

References

1927 births
2018 deaths
Canadian Anglicans
Canadian businesspeople
20th-century Canadian civil servants
Canadian economists
Harvard University alumni
Canadian university and college faculty deans
Canadian university and college vice-presidents
Chancellors of the University of Western Ontario
Fellows of the Royal Society of Canada
Officers of the Order of Canada
Academic staff of the University of Western Ontario
University of Western Ontario alumni
People from Bruce County